Julian Reister was the defending champion, but decided not to compete.
Aljaž Bedene won the tournament, defeating Adam Pavlásek 7−5, 6−2.

Seeds

Draw

Finals

Top half

Bottom half

References
 Main Draw
 Qualifying Draw

Garden Open - Singles
2015 Singles
Garden